Brickellia glomerata is a Mexican  species of flowering plants in the family Asteraceae. It is found in central and southwestern Mexico, in the states of México, Morelos, Guerrero, and Oaxaca.

Brickellia glomerata produces several flower heads with disc florets but no ray florets. The heads are  clumped together in groups called "glomerules," hence the scientific name of the species.

References

External links
Photo of herbarium specimen collected in México State

glomerata
Flora of Mexico
Plants described in 1901